Li Mingqi (born 20 February 1936) is a Chinese actress best known for her roles as Granny Wang on The Water Margin (1996), Wet-Nurse Rong on My Fair Princess (1997) and Granny Sun on The Return of the Condor Heroes (2006).

Early life
Li was born in Dandong, Fengtian Province, Manchukuo, on February 20, 1936. Her father died early. At the age of 16, she joined the Railway propaganda team as an actress.

Acting career
In 1960 Li made her film debut with a small role in Train 12.

In 1996 she gained national fame for her starring role as Granny Wang in the television series The Water Margin, adapted from Shi Nai'an's classical novel of the same title. 

Li became widely known to audiences with My Fair Princess (1997), in which she played Wet-Nurse Rong. Other cast members are Zhang Tielin, Zhao Wei, Alec Su, Ruby Lin, and Zhou Jie. She reprised her role in My Fair Princess 2, but was not in the third installment, My Fair Princess 3.

In 2004, she was cast as Empress Dowager Cixi in Cook Officer, opposite Li Baotian, Tian Hairong, Shu Chang and Wang Luyao.

In 2006, Li had a supporting role in The Return of the Condor Heroes, a wuxia television series adaptation based on the novel of the same name by Jin Yong. It stars Huang Xiaoming and Liu Yifei.

On February 25, 2018, she appeared in the CCTV New Year's Gala alongside Lin Yongjian, Yang Shaohua, Wang Liyun, Li Qi, Li Chengru, and Yang Zi.

Personal life
Li is married and has a son named Wang Jun.

Filmography

Film

Television

Film and TV Awards

References

External links 
 

1936 births
People from Dandong
Living people
Chinese film actresses
Chinese television actresses
Actresses from Liaoning
Hui actresses